Dheewarayo is a 1964 Sri Lankan Sinhala drama film directed by M. Masthan and produced by K. Gunaratnam. It stars Gamini Fonseka and Sandhya Kumari in lead roles with Vijitha Mallika and Hugo Fernando in supportive roles. Music for the film is done by M. K. Rocksamy.

The film became a huge blockbuster in that year and received critical acclaim at film festivals. The film was nominated for five Best Films at the 1965 Sarasaviya Awards and Gamini Fonseka, who played the lead role of Francis in the film won the award for the Best Actor.

Cast
 Gamini Fonseka as Francis
 Sandhya Kumari as Rosalin
 Anthony C. Perera
 Ignatius Gunaratne as Rosalin's Thaththa
 Hugo Fernando
 B. S. Perera
 Ruby de Mel
 Christy Leonard Perera
 Vijitha Mallika
 Herbert Amarawickrama
 M. V. Balan
 Kumari Perera

Songs
"Sathuta Soke" – Latha Walpola
"Samaye Samagiye Pathurala" – Mohideen Baig, Mallika Kahawita, Christy Leonard Perera and chorus
"Nilata Nile Wihide Yayi" – Latha and Dharmadasa Walpola
"Awilla Awilla" – Latha Walpola, Mohideen Baig, Christy Leonard Perera and chorus
"Walle Sibina Ralle" – Mohideen Baig, Mallika Kahawita, Christy Leonard Perera and chorus
"Agada Sagaraye" –J. A. Milton Perera
"Ra Bowi Bowi Yayi" – J. A. Milton Perera, Haroon Lanthra and Noel Guneratne
"Maligawe Ma Rajina" – Sujatha Perera

References

External links
Sri Lanka Cinema Database
 

1964 films

1960s Sinhala-language films